Brian Edwards (born October 6, 1984) is an American former soccer player who last played as a goalkeeper for Degerfors IF.

Career

Youth and College
Edwards attended Providence High School in Charlotte, North Carolina, played club soccer for the Charlotte Soccer Club, and played college soccer at Wake Forest University. In his four-year playing career at Wake Forest, Edwards put up a career 0.78 GA average, 44 career shutouts, and led the Demon Deacons to victory in the 2007 Division I Men's College Cup, defeating Ohio State University in the final.  Edwards was named the Final Four's defensive MVP. During his college years he also played with Carolina Dynamo of the USL Premier Development League.

Professional
Edwards was drafted in the second round (twenty-eighth overall) of the 2008 MLS SuperDraft by Toronto FC, which intended to use Edwards as a back-up goalkeeper behind Greg Sutton. He made his MLS debut on March 29, 2008, in a 2–0 defeat to Columbus Crew. On March 25, 2010 Toronto FC released the American goalkeeper by mutual consent, the 25-year-old became a free agent. After a trial at Seattle Sounders FC in April 2010, he signed with the Charlotte Eagles of the USL Second Division.

In September 2010 he signed with the San Jose Earthquakes of Major League Soccer for the remainder of the season.  Being after the roster freeze date he was activated only on game days and served as the backup for Jon Busch. He was waived by San Jose on March 1, 2011.

As of March 2011 Edwards is playing for Degerfors IF in the Swedish Second Division. During his first season at the club he had the fourth highest save percentage in the league. He is now retired and is an assistant coach at UNC Charlotte. Prior to joining the Charlotte coaching staff, Edwards was an assistant coach at Hofstra University. In 2015, Edwards helped coach Hofstra soccer to the 2015 CAA championship and the second round of the NCAA tournament.

Edwards announced his retirement on March 2, 2013.

Honors

Toronto FC
 Canadian Championship: 2009

Wake Forest University
 NCAA Men's Division I Soccer Championship: 2007

References

External links

 Wake Forest profile
 His blog
 

1984 births
Living people
American expatriate sportspeople in Canada
American expatriate soccer players
American soccer players
North Carolina Fusion U23 players
Charlotte Eagles players
Degerfors IF players
Expatriate soccer players in Canada
Association football goalkeepers
Major League Soccer players
NCAA Division I Men's Soccer Tournament Most Outstanding Player winners
Sportspeople from Summit, New Jersey
San Jose Earthquakes players
Soccer players from New Jersey
Soccer players from Charlotte, North Carolina
Toronto FC players
USL League Two players
USL Second Division players
Wake Forest Demon Deacons men's soccer players
Toronto FC draft picks